This award has been given to prestigious people such as Ray Charles, Aretha Franklin, Sidney Poitier, Little Richard, and Spike Lee. The NAACP Image Award winners for the Hall of Fame Award:

References

NAACP Image Awards